Tritia recidiva is a species of sea snail, a marine gastropod mollusk in the family Nassariidae, the nassa mud snails or dog whelks.

Description
The shell grows to a length of 12 mm. It has a high, slightly cyrtoconoid (almost with the shape of a cone, but having convex sides) spire and a somewhat constricted body whorl. The protoconch consists of ca. 3 rather large and smooth whorls. The first three teleoconch whorls contain spiral cords and axial folds, which fade out on the next two except for the subsutural spirals. The body whorl resumes a spiral sculpture of very even, flattened cords much that are broader than the interspaces. The aperture is lanceolate. The outer lip is slightly thickened externally and bears 5–6 strong rounded denticles inside. The parietal callus is appressed and devoid of a parietal denticle. It continues into a columellar callus which has a rounded edge, slightly raised over the siphonal canal and bearing a few tubercles. The colour of the shell has a brownish hue over a white background. The subsutural and median cords are articulated with darker brown. The aperture is white.

Distribution
This species occurs in the Western Mediterranean Sea and in the Atlantic Ocean off Madeira.

References

 Adam W. & Glibert M. (1974). Contribution à la connaissance de Nassarius semistriatus (Brocchi, 1814). (Mollusca : Gastropoda). Bulletin de l'Institut Royal des Sciences Naturelles de Belgique 50(3): 1–78.
 Gofas, S.; Le Renard, J.; Bouchet, P. (2001). Mollusca, in: Costello, M.J. et al. (Ed.) (2001). European register of marine species: a check-list of the marine species in Europe and a bibliography of guides to their identification. Collection Patrimoines Naturels, 50: pp. 180–213

External links
 Watson, R. B. (1897). On the marine Mollusca of Madeira; with descriptions of thirty-five new species, and an index-list of all the known sea-dwelling species of that island. Journal of the Linnean Society of London, Zoology. 26(19): 233-329, pl. 19-20
 Pallary, P. (1900). Coquilles marines du littoral du département d'Oran. Journal de Conchyliologie. 48(3): 211-422
 Dautzenberg, Ph. (1889). Contribution à la faune malacologique des Iles Açores. Résultats des Campagnes Scientifiques Accomplies sur son Yacht par Albert Ier Prince Souverain de Monaco, I. Imprimerie de Monaco: Monaco. 112, IV plates pp
 S.; Luque, Á. A.; Templado, J.; Salas, C. (2017). A national checklist of marine Mollusca in Spanish waters. Scientia Marina. 81(2) : 241-254, and supplementary online materia
 

Nassariidae
Gastropods described in 1876